Hopkinton is a census-designated place (CDP) in Washington County, Rhode Island, United States, comprising the central village in the town of Hopkinton. It was first listed as a CDP prior to the 2020 census. The village is also known as Hopkinton City, and the center of the village comprises the Hopkinton City Historic District.

Hopkinton village is on the western edge of Washington County, in the west-central part of the town of Hopkinton. Its western border is the Connecticut state line. Rhode Island Route 3 passes through the center of the village, leading northeast  to Hope Valley, the largest village in the town of Hopkinton, and south  to Ashaway, the second-largest village. Interstate 95 runs through the southeast part of the Hopkinton CDP, with access from Exit 1 with Route 3 between Hopkinton village and Ashaway. I-95 leads northeast  to Providence, the state capital, and southwest  to New London, Connecticut.

Demographics

References 

Census-designated places in Washington County, Rhode Island
Census-designated places in Rhode Island